In Thailand, television broadcasting started on 24 June, 1955 (in NTSC). Color telecasts (PAL, System B/G 625 lines) were started in 1967, and full-time color transmissions were launched in 1975. As of November 2020, there are currently 21 digital (DVB-T2) TV channels in Thailand.

Television providers 

Subscription providers are available, with differences in the number of channels, capabilities such as the program guide (EPG), video on demand (VOD), high-definition (HD), interactive television via the red button, and coverage across Thailand. Set-top boxes are generally used to receive these services. Households viewing TV from the internet are not tracked by the Thai government.

Analog terrestrial television 
This is currently the traditional way of receiving television in Thailand, however it has now largely been supplanted by digital providers. There are 6 channels; three of them are government public-owned by MCOT the 2 television channels terrestrial free-to-air Modernine TV and Channel 3; Channel 5 and BBTV Channel 7 are owned by Royal Thai Army; NBT and Thai PBS are fully government-owned. Analog terrestrial transmissions were scheduled to be switched off in phases as part of the digital switchover, which was expected to be completed in 2020 in line with ASEAN recommendations, however, the changeover has yet to come into effect.

Provincial television was discontinued in 1988, replaced by NBT, which has two hours of local programming in each of the provinces.

Digital terrestrial television 

In 2005, the Ministry of Information announced their plan to digitalize nationwide free-to-air TV broadcasts led by MCOT. Trial broadcasts were undertaken, involving one thousand households in Bangkok from December 2000 till May 2001.
In December 2013, the National Broadcasting and Telecommunications Commission (NBTC) set up series of auction for DTTV.  Four types of licenses are offered: High-Def. channel license, Standard-Def. channel license, News channel license and Youth/Family channel license.  All the major operators and content owners in the industry won the bid for new licenses e.g. BEC World, Bangkok Broadcasting & T.V., GMM Grammy, Thairath Newspaper, Nation Multimedia Group, TrueVisions etc. According to the license condition, DTTV services launched since April 2014.

Bangkok commercial terrestrial channels
Bangkok commercial free-to-air stations include:

Cable television 
All national cable TVs in Thailand must accept by MCOT, The first provider is International Broadcasting Corporation (IBC) in 1989, next one is Thai Sky TV in 1991 (but off-air in 1997). Universal Television Cable Network (UTV) is the third provider in 1993. But after Asian financial crisis, UTV merged with IBC in 1998, changed its name to United Broadcasting Corporation or UBC (TrueVisions in present) and became a monopoly provider.

IP television (IPTV) 
In contrast to Internet TV, IPTV refers to services operated and controlled by a single company, who may also control the 'Final Mile' to the consumers' premises.

Mobile television 
True Move provide mobile television services for reception on third generation mobile phones. They consist of a mixture of regular channels as well as made for mobile channels with looped content. True Move H TV now offers more than 20 channels to True-H 3G subscribers who own compatible mobile phones. Yet, True is expected to roll out broadcast mobile TV services based on DVB-H in the near future.

Internet television 
Television received via the Internet may be free, subscription or pay-per-view, multicast, unicast, or peer-to-peer, streamed or downloaded, and use a variety of distribution technologies.  Playback is normally via a computer and broadband Internet connection, although digital media receivers or media centre computers can be used for playback on televisions, such as a computer equipped with Windows Media Center.

Popularity of terrestrial TV stations
The audience share achieved by each terrestrial channel in Thailand is shown in the first table below.  The second table shows the share each channel receives of total TV advertising spending. Channel 7 is both the most popular and most commercially successful station with just under 50% of the total audience followed by Channel 3 at just under 30%.  The other terrestrial stations share the remaining 20% of the TV audience between them.

Audience Share:

Market Share - Share of total TV advertising spending:

Audience Share (2022):

See also 
 List of television stations in Thailand
 Media of Thailand

References 

 
1955 establishments in Thailand